Ronald Stanley Filipek (February 5, 1944 – December 9, 2005) was a professional basketball player who spent one season in the National Basketball Association (NBA) as a member of the Philadelphia 76ers (1967–68). He attended Tennessee Technological University where he was drafted by the 76ers in the ninth round of the 1967 NBA draft.

External links
 

1944 births
2005 deaths
American men's basketball players
Forwards (basketball)
Philadelphia 76ers draft picks
Philadelphia 76ers players
Tennessee Tech Golden Eagles men's basketball players